Fotomaker  was a power pop group from Long Island, NY which released three albums between 1978 and 1979. They made three albums within the span of a little over a year.

Beginnings
The band was formed in 1977 by bassist Gene Cornish and drummer Dino Danelli, former members of The Rascals. Rounding out the group was guitarist/vocalist Wally Bryson, formerly of the Raspberries and guitarist/vocalist Lex Marchesi and keyboardist/vocalist Frankie Vinci. Fotomaker debuted at the newly remodeled Cleveland Agora in early 1978.

Albums
The 1978 debut release, simply titled Fotomaker, was a classic example of 1970s power pop: hook-laden choruses, tight overdriven guitars, lush strings, 12-string acoustic guitars, a few melodic ballads, 3-minute radio-friendly tunes and strong vocal harmonies throughout. The LP was released on Atlantic Records.

The second album, Vis-a-Vis, was hurriedly released later in October, 1978. It was recorded at The Record Plant studios (used by the Raspberries) that summer on Wally Bryson's suggestion. Vis-a-Vis opened with Vinci's song "Miles Away", which was released as a single and peaked at number 63 on the Billboard Hot 100. The album itself was not a hit, and received limited support and promotion. Wally Bryson had already left the band before the band's third album, Transfer Station, which included several disco-flavored tracks. Fotomaker did not tour in support of Transfer Station. The album failed to reach the charts, and the group disbanded shortly afterwards.

All three albums were eventually re-released on CD, and Rhino Records even released a best-of compilation in 1995 entitled The Fotomaker Collection.

Afterlife
In 1997, Gene Cornish and Dino Danelli, along with former Rascals bandmates Felix Cavaliere and Eddie Brigati, were inducted into the Rock-n-Roll Hall of Fame.

Wally Bryson returned home to Cleveland early 1979, teaming up with Dann Klawon (aka: It's Cold Outside-The Choir) in his band "Peter Panic". Klawon's band had already been gigging around NE Ohio on/off for number of years, doing mostly cover & some original material. The arrival of Wally Bryson signaled a different direction for "Peter Panic", now poised to work mostly on original material with the acquisition of additional member's Rick Bell on sax (aka Michael Stanley), Todd Weaver on drums & Dave Thomas. Despite positive local media interest & a decent fan base following at many local clubs, topped off with Headlining at Cleveland Agora in February 1980, the band never attracted the attention needed to garner a major recording contract, and despite some good originals, they had disband by Summer 1980. Moving forward Wally has since turned up in Raspberries reunions over the years; he has also collaborated with his son Jesse, in The Bryson Group. Frankie Vinci has done plenty of TV work, including jingles and music for the Super Bowl, and has written songs for others such as country artist Tim McGraw. He also wrote songs for the 1983 summer camp slasher film Sleepaway Camp.

Discography
Albums
 Fotomaker (Atlantic, 1978) US #88, Produced by Eddie Kramer
 Vis-à-vis (Atlantic, 1978) Produced by Gene Cornish and Dino Danelli
 Transfer Station (Atlantic, 1979) Produced by Barry Mraz
Singles
 Where Have You Been All My Life (Atlantic, 1978) US #81
 The Other Side (So When I See You Again (Atlantic, 1978) US #110
 Miles Away (Atlantic, 1979) US #63

References

External links
The (Young) Rascals page at The Rock-n-Roll Hall of Fame's website

American power pop groups
Musical groups from Long Island
Musical groups established in 1978